The 2017 China Amateur Football League season, also known as Shan Lin Financial China Amateur Football League for sponsorship reasons, was the 16th season since its establishment in 2002. It is the highest amateur association football league in PR China with some semi-professional clubs. 50 clubs were qualified for the second round.

Promotion and relegation

From Amateur League 
Teams promoted to 2017 China League Two 
 Dalian Boyang
 Shaanxi Chang'an Athletic
 Shanghai Sunfun
 Jilin Baijia
 Zhenjiang Huasa

Format
The qualification structure is as follows:
First round: Chinese Football Association subordinate Provincial, City League, champion will advance to the second round.
Second round: It is divided into eight groups. The top two teams of each group will advance to Third round.
Third round: The third round is a two-legged elimination. The four winners may be qualify for the 2018 China League Two. 
Play-offs: 2017 League Two 23rd-placed and 24th-placed faces 2017 CAL 5th-placed and 6th-placed for a play-off match. The winner may be qualify for the 2018 China League Two.

First round
China Amateur Football League includes 44 regional leagues. 2016 or 2017 season champion will advance to the second round.

Teams qualified for the second round

Matches

Qiqihaer Zhongjian Bituminous Concrete won 4–0 on aggregate.

2–2 on aggregate. Yanbian Beiguo won 5–3 on penalties.

Zibo Sunday won 9–0 on aggregate.

Qinghai Zhuangbo won 3–2 on aggregate.

Fujian Tianxin won 3–2 on aggregate.

Anhui Hefei Guiguan won 1–0 on aggregate.

Lhasa Urban Construction Investment won 4–3 on aggregate.

Zhaoqing Hengtai won 4–3 on aggregate.

Quarter-finals

|}

Matches

Qiqihaer Zhongjian Bituminous Concrete won 3–1 on aggregate.

3–3 on aggregate. Anhui Hefei Guiguan won 4–3 on penalties.

Zibo Sunday won 1–0 on aggregate.

0–0 on aggregate. Zhaoqing Hengtai won 5–3 on penalties.

5th–8th place semifinals

5th–6th place

2017 CAL 5th-placed and 6th-placed faces 2017 League Two 23rd-placed and 24th-placed for a play-off match. The winner may be qualify for the 2018 China League Two.  See 2017 China League Two#Relegation play-off.

Semi-finals

|}

Matches

Anhui Hefei Guiguan won 2–1 on aggregate.

Zibo Sunday won 2–1 on aggregate.

Third-Place Match

|}

Qiqihaer Zhongjian Bituminous Concrete won 3–2 on aggregate.

Final Match

|}

Zibo Sunday won 2–1 on aggregate.
Notes

References

External links
Official site 

4